State Trunk Highway 78 (often called Highway 78, STH-78 or WIS 78) is a state highway in the U.S. state of Wisconsin. It runs north–south in south central Wisconsin from Portage to the Illinois border near Gratiot.

History
In the 1920s, Highway 78 was originally located on the Door County Peninsula on what is now Highway 57. 

In 1963, the segment of STH-78 from the new I-90/I-94 freeway interchange south of Portage northerly to Highway 33 was improved to a four-lane divided facility. A year later, this four-lane divided highway (and the STH-78 designation with it) was extended northerly across the Wisconsin River then bypassing Portage to the west before merging into the existing two-lane route of US 51 north of the city. The entire four-lane divided portion of STH-78 from I-90/I-94 northerly to US-51 was shown as a full freeway with interchange beginning with the 1966 official state highway map, so it can be assumed the conversion to freeway occurred about this time (c.1965). In more recent decades, the short segment of STH-78 freeway was the only portion of the route from I-90/I-94 at Portage northerly past Wausau that was not signed as part of US-51, although signs along the route did indicate "TO US-51." Then in 1996, US-51 from Rothschild (south of Wausau) southerly to Portage was concurrently designated as Interstate 39 and to connect this new Interstate route with nearby I-90/I-94, the entire STH-78 freeway from US-51 north of Portage to I-90/I-94 was redesignated as part of I-39, with STH-78 losing approximately eight miles of length in the process.

Major intersections

See also

References

External links

078
Transportation in Lafayette County, Wisconsin
Transportation in Iowa County, Wisconsin
Transportation in Green County, Wisconsin
Transportation in Dane County, Wisconsin
Transportation in Sauk County, Wisconsin
Transportation in Columbia County, Wisconsin